In enzymology, an isochorismatase is an enzyme that catalyzes the chemical reaction

isochorismate + H2O  2,3-dihydroxy-2,3-dihydrobenzoate + pyruvate

Thus, the two substrates of this enzyme are isochorismate and H2O, whereas its two products are 2,3-dihydroxy-2,3-dihydrobenzoate and pyruvate.

This enzyme belongs to the family of hydrolases, specifically those acting on ether bonds (ether hydrolases).  The systematic name of this enzyme class is isochorismate pyruvate-hydrolase. Other names in common use include 2,3-dihydro-2,3-dihydroxybenzoate synthase, 2,3-dihydroxy-2,3-dihydrobenzoate synthase, and 2,3-dihydroxy-2,3-dihydrobenzoic synthase.  This enzyme participates in the biosynthesis of siderophore group (nonribosomal).

Structural studies

References

 

EC 3.3.2
Enzymes of known structure